This list includes commanders of the Second Army of Turkey, who were, in their time of service, nominal heads of the Second Army, one of the four field armies of the Turkish Land Forces.

The current Commander of the Second Army is Lieutenant general Sinan Yayla, since 22 August 2019.

See also 
 Chief of the Turkish General Staff
 List of commanders of the Turkish Land Forces

References

Commanders of the Second Army
Commanders of Second Army